The Thrill Hunter is a 1926 American silent comedy adventure film directed by Eugene De Rue and starring William Haines, Kathryn McGuire and Alma Bennett. An American is mistaken for the ruler of a small European principality, and forced to marry. He manages to escape, and publishes an account of his adventures.

Cast
 William Haines as Peter J. Smith 
 Kathryn McGuire as Alice Maynard 
 Alma Bennett as Princess Zola 
 E. J. Ratcliffe as T.B. Maynard 
 Bobby Dunn as Ferdie 
 Frankie Darro as Boy Prince

Preservation status
An incomplete print is held at the Library of Congress archive.

References

Bibliography
 Langman, Larry. American Film Cycles: The Silent Era. Greenwood Publishing, 1998.

External links

1926 films
American silent feature films
Columbia Pictures films
American black-and-white films
American adventure comedy films
1920s adventure comedy films
1926 comedy films
1920s English-language films
1920s American films
Silent American comedy films
Silent adventure comedy films